A theater manager, also called a general manager, managing director, or intendant (British English), is the administrator of a theater. They often also have the responsibilities of an artistic director but in any case oversee all administrative, marketing, production, and financial functions of their theater. They often report to a board and must have excellent communication skills, the ability to work independently, and strong organizational capacity. They must also have experience with budget creation and management, planning, budgeting/financial tracking, contract management, accounting, and schedule tracking.

See also
 List of theatre managers and producers
 Opera management

References